National Highway 62  (NH 62) is a National Highway in Northeast India. It starts from Damra in Assam and ends at Dalu, in Meghalaya.

Route
 Baghmara

See also
 List of National Highways in India (by Highway Number)
 List of National Highways in India
 National Highways Development Project

References

External links
  NH network map of India

62
62
National highways in India (old numbering)